The International Association of Lyceum Clubs was a women's club founded in London, England in 1903 by Constance Smedley. The club is still active.

Background
The club was formed as a place for women involved with literature, journalism, art, science and medicine to meet in an atmosphere that was similar to the men's professional clubs of that era. Woman would be able to hold meetings, provide meals, and accommodations in a professional environment.

Constance Smedley founded the first club as the International Lyceum Club for Women Artists and Writers at 128 Piccadilly in London. Sister organizations were soon established in Berlin, Paris, Florence, etc.

Countries with Lyceum Clubs
Some countries have multiple clubs

Australia – Lyceum Club Adelaide · Lyceum Club Brisbane · Melbourne Lyceum Club · Karrakatta Club Incorporated (Perth) · The Sydney Lyceum Club Inc.
Austria
Belgium
Cyprus – Larnaca · Limassol · Nicosia · Paralimni
Finland – Helsinki · Oulu · Turku
France – Bordeaux · Brittany · Caen-Normandy · Dijon-Burgundy · Fontainebleau Ile de France · Grenoble · Lille · Limousin · Lyon · Marseille · Orléans · Paris · Pau-Béarn · Troyes–Champagne 
Germany – Aachen ·  Berlin · Frankfurt Rhein-Main · Hamburg · Karlsrube · Konstanz · Munich · Stuttgart
Greece – Athens
Italy – Catania · Cremona · Florence · Genoa · Naples
Morocco
Netherlands – Amsterdam · Groningen · Nijmegen
New Zealand – Auckland Lyceum Club · Morrinsville · Otorohanga · Tauranga · Te Awamutu · Te Kuiti · Te Puke Lyceum Club · Waikato · Whakatane
Portugal 
Russia
Sweden
Switzerland – Basel · Bern · Bienne · Geneva · La Chaux-de-Fonds · Lausanne · Lucerne · Locarno · Lugano · Neuchatel · St Gallen · Zurich
United Kingdom – London · Edinburgh
United States of America

Further reading 
 .  
 Bomford, Janette. "Circles of Friendship: The Centenary History of the Lyceum Club Melbourne". Lyceum Club, Melbourne, 2012. .
 Wilmshurst, Irene; Hawthorn, Bryony; "Memories of Hamilton and living in Nawton : an interview with Irene Wilmshurst", City Libraries, Hamilton, N.Z. (ed.). Hamilton, N.Z. : Hamilton City Libraries, 2014. CD for computer : English 
Z. Thomas, Women Art Workers and the Arts and Crafts Movement (2020), see Chapter 1.

See also
The Lyceum, Liverpool
Lyceum Club (Dallas)
Lyceum Club (Australia)
Karrakatta Club

External links 
Official page

Footnotes

Notes

References 

Women's clubs
Women in London
1904 establishments in the United Kingdom